William Paty (1758 – 11 December 1800) was a British surveyor, architect and mason working mainly in Bristol.

Life

He was the son of Thomas Paty of Bristol a monumental mason and architect, and followed in his shoes. He trained at the Royal Academy Architectural School from 1775.

He was appointed City Surveyor of Bristol in 1788. 

He died on 11 December 1800 and is buried in St Augustine's Church in Bristol. His wife Sarah died in 1807 and is buried with him.

List of works

 7-12 Brunswick Square, Bristol (1784).
 7 Great George Street (1789–91), now the Georgian House Museum
 23, 25 and 27 Great George Street (probably at the same time as No.7, 1789-91), No.25 being the largest of them 
 85 - 91 Ashley Road, Bristol (1791-1795).
 Blaise Castle House (1795-6)
 Christ Church with St Ewen, Broad Street (1786-9)
 A memorial to Richard Musgrave (d. 1785) in Lismore Cathedral, Co. Waterford
 A monument to Samuel Peach (d. 1785) in Church of St. Mary the Virgin, Olveston, Gloucestershire.
 A monument to Agnes Chisholm (d. 1798) in Church of St Andrew, Cromhall, South Gloucestershire.
 Monuments in Aust Church, Gloucestershire.
 Monument to Thomas Stokes in Church of the Holy Trinity, Wickwar, Gloucestershire.
 Tablet in Church of St Mary, Lydney, Gloucestershire.

References

 H.M. Colvin, A Biographical Dictionary of British Architects, 1600-1840 (1997) 
 Andrew Foyle, Bristol, Pevsner Architectural Guides (2004) 

1758 births
1800 deaths
18th-century English architects
Architects from Bristol